Robert Franz Gucher (born 20 February 1991) is an Austrian professional footballer who plays as a midfielder for Italian  club Pordenone.

Club career
Born in Graz, Gucher started his career at hometown club Grazer AK. In July 2008, aged 17, he joined Frosinone of Serie B along with Dieter Elsneg after his club was expelled from professional football.

He played his league debut on 21 April 2009 as starter against Modena, he was replaced by Nunzio Di Roberto in the 60th minutes. In the next season he played eight starts and two substitutes appearances in Serie B.

On 1 February 2010, he was loaned to Genoa for €200,000, while Elsneg joined Genoa's city rival Sampdoria earlier in January. He played at their Primavera Under-20 Team.

On 24 June 2010, Genoa signed him in a co-ownership deal, for €1.3 million, co-currently, Frosinone signed the remain 50% rights of Salvatore Aurelio  (for €800,000) and Diogo Tavares (for €600,000), and the loan of Selim Ben Djemia (for €100,000) But Gucher spent the first half of the 2010–11 season at Frosinone, and was loaned to Austrian Bundesliga side Kapfenberger SV for 1.5 years on 31 January 2011.

In June 2012, Gucher returned to Frosinone.

On 31 January 2023, Gucher signed a two-and-a-half year contract with Pordenone in Serie C.

International career
Gucher represented Austria at under-17 level before going on to play for the under-19 side at 2010 UEFA European Under-19 Championship and the under-20 side at the 2011 FIFA U-20 World Cup.

Gucher got his first call up to the senior Austria squad for a friendly against Switzerland in November 2015.

References

External links
 Profile at AIC.Football.it  
 Profile at Genoa 

1991 births
Footballers from Graz
Living people
Austrian footballers
Association football midfielders
Grazer AK players
Frosinone Calcio players
Kapfenberger SV players
L.R. Vicenza players
Pisa S.C. players
Pordenone Calcio players
Austrian Football Bundesliga players
Serie A players
Serie B players
Serie C players
Austria youth international footballers
Austrian expatriate footballers
Austrian expatriate sportspeople in Italy
Expatriate footballers in Italy